The Santander Golf Tour Barcelona is a women's professional golf tournament on Spain's Santander Golf Tour that has featured on the LET Access Series. It was first played in 2016 and is held near Barcelona, Spain.

Winners

References

External links

LET Access Series events
Golf tournaments in Spain